David Lewis "D.A." Doman (born August 3, 1984), known professionally as D.A. Got That Dope (stylized as d.a. got that dope), is an American record producer, songwriter and music executive from Chicago. He started off his career in the mid-2000s working with Chicago underground artists such as Mikkey Halsted, Kidz in the Hall, and Bump J. In 2011, after a few years handling drum programming for J. R. Rotem, which landed him a multi platinum plaque for the co-production of JLS' "Everybody in Love"— he moved to Los Angeles in search of better opportunities. He has since become known for producing the songs "Privacy" by Chris Brown, "Zeze" by Kodak Black (featuring Travis Scott and Offset), and "Dip" by Tyga (featuring Nicki Minaj), "Taste" by Tyga (featuring Offset), and "Godzilla" by Eminem (featuring Juice Wrld). D.A. is a music executive that discovered, signed, and is currently A&R for 24kGoldn.

Production discography

Charted singles

Non-singles

See also 
:Category:Songs written by D.A. Got That Dope

References

External links 

American hip hop record producers
1984 births
Living people
Musicians from Chicago
Record producers from Illinois
Songwriters from Illinois